Lindtveit is a village in Arendal municipality in Agder county, Norway. The village is located just east of the river Nidelva along the Norwegian County Road 408.

References

Villages in Agder
Arendal